The House in the Horseshoe, also known as the Alston House, is a historic house in Glendon, North Carolina in Moore County, and a historic site managed by the North Carolina Department of Natural and Cultural Resources' Historic Sites division.  The home, built in 1772 by Philip Alston, was the site of a battle between loyalists under the command of David Fanning and patriot militiamen under Alston's command on either July 29  or August 5, 1781 (the date being unclear in available records).  The battle ended with Alston's surrender to Fanning, in which Alston's wife negotiated the terms with the loyalists.

In 1798, the home was sold to Benjamin Williams, who would become Governor of North Carolina from 1799 to 1802, and again in 1807–1808.  Williams owned approximately 103 slaves and produced about 300 acres of cotton annually at the site of the house.

The Moore County Historical Association purchased the home in 1954, and ownership was then transferred to the state in 1955.  The property was made a North Carolina Historic Site in 1971.  It was added to the National Register of Historic Places in 1970. The property is now used as a museum and as the site of Revolutionary War reenactments and living history demonstrations each year.

References

External links
 North Carolina State Historic Sites page
North Carolina History Project, "House in the Horseshoe"

Houses on the National Register of Historic Places in North Carolina
Houses completed in 1772
Museums in Moore County, North Carolina
Historic house museums in North Carolina
Museums established in 1971
North Carolina State Historic Sites
Plantation houses in North Carolina
Protected areas of Moore County, North Carolina
1772 establishments in North Carolina
National Register of Historic Places in Moore County, North Carolina
Houses in Moore County, North Carolina